Drillia eborea is a species of sea snail, a marine gastropod mollusk in the family Drilliidae.

Description
The length of this shell attains 12 mm; its diameter 4 mm.

The small, solid, lanceolate shell is yellowish white. It is everywhere densely and faintly grooved by transverse lines, most so near the sutures. The apical whorls are longitudinally folded. The shell contains 8 whorls. The aperture is narrow, lunate and placed somewhat laterally. The outer lip is thick, simple, with a slight sinus near its posterior junction. The columella has a thick, erect callus, quite thick posteriorly. The rostrum is reflexed.

Distribution
This marine species occurs off Kikaia Island, Japan.

References

 F.B. Meek (1864), Check List of the Invertrebate Fossils of North America: Miocene; Smithsonian Institution
  Tucker, J.K. 2004 Catalog of recent and fossil turrids (Mollusca: Gastropoda). Zootaxa 682:1–1295

External links
 WMSDB - Worldwide Mollusc Species Data Base: Drillia eborea

eborea
Gastropods described in 1860